Canadians in the United Arab Emirates are residents of the United Arab Emirates who originate from Canada. They are included Emirati-born residents of Canadian origin or Canadian emigrants in the UAE.

Demographics
As of 2014, there were over 40,000 Canadians living in the country. This includes around 12,000 Arab Canadians. The total population has experienced an increase since 2007, when the number of Canadians was around 12,000.

Education
There are some Canadian-curriculum international schools in the UAE serving expatriate students, as well as a Canadian University of Dubai.

Canada-UAE relations

Canada has an embassy in Abu Dhabi and a consulate-general in Dubai.

See also
Canadian diaspora

References

 
United Arab Emirates
Ethnic groups in the United Arab Emirates